The Ivan Tennant Memorial Award is awarded annually to the top academic high school player in the Ontario Hockey League.  It is named in honour of the late Ivan Tennant, a former education consultant for the Kitchener Rangers who worked to develop the academic standards for the entire league during twenty years of service. The award was first given out in 2005.

Winners
List of recipients of the Ivan Tennant Memorial Award.

See also
 Bobby Smith Trophy (Top academic player combined with on-ice performance)
 Roger Neilson Memorial Award (Top academic college/university player)
 List of Canadian Hockey League awards

References

External links
 Ontario Hockey League

Ontario Hockey League trophies and awards
Awards established in 2005
2005 establishments in Ontario